Pultenaea echinula, commonly known as curved bush-pea, is a species of flowering plant in the family Fabaceae and is endemic to a small area of New South Wales. It is an erect shrub with linear, needle-shaped, grooved leaves, and dense clusters of yellow to orange and red flowers.

Description
The flowers are arranged in dense clusters without bracts on the ends of branchlets.

Taxonomy and naming
Pultenaea echinula was first formally described in 1825 by Augustin Pyramus de Candolle in Prodromus Systematis Naturalis Regni Vegetabilis from an unpublished description by Franz Sieber.

Distribution and habitat
This pultenaea grows in forest, often on rocky hillsides in the Wollemi area and in the upper Blue Mountains.

References

echinula
Flora of New South Wales
Plants described in 1825
Taxa named by Augustin Pyramus de Candolle